Audiotonix is a British multinational holding company established in 2014 and headquartered in Greater London, United Kingdom. Audiotonix companies design and manufacture mixing consoles and professional audio equipment for live events and broadcast sound.

History
Audiotonix was established in 2014 by combining Allen & Heath, Calrec, and DiGiCo. James Gordon, formerly DiGiCo's CEO, was appointed CEO of Audiotonix Group.

Audiotonix acquired Solid State Logic in 2017, and KLANG:technologies the following year.

In 2021, the company acquired Sound Devices.

In 2022 the company acquired Slate Digital.

Brands

Allen & Heath
Calrec
DiGiCo
DiGiGrid
Group One Ltd
KLANG:technologies
Solid State Logic
Sound Devices
Slate Digital

References

Further reading
 Electra Private Equity PLC - Audiotonix Extended Case Study

External links
 

Audio mixing console manufacturers
Audio equipment manufacturers of the United Kingdom
Manufacturers of professional audio equipment
Manufacturing companies of England
Holding companies of the United Kingdom
British companies established in 2014